Investor-owned utilities (IOUs) are private enterprises acting as public utilities. Examples may range from a family that owns a well on their property to international energy conglomerates.

References

Public utilities